Chloroclystis comorana is a species of moth of the  family Geometridae. It is found in the Comoros.

References

Chloroclystis
Moths described in 1978
Moths of the Comoros